The 640s decade ran from January 1, 640, to December 31, 649.

Significant people

References

Sources